Events in the year 2023 in Vietnam.

Incumbents

Events 
Ongoing: COVID-19 pandemic in Vietnam
 17 January – Nguyễn Xuân Phúc resigns as President of Vietnam, the second highest-ranked position in Vietnam, citing responsibility for several recent scandals in the government.
 16 February – A Da Nang court sentences four South Korean men to imprisonment for smuggling around 200 South Koreans into Vietnam during the COVID-19 pandemic when the country suspended the entry of all foreigners from 2020 to 2021.
 2 March – The National Assembly of Vietnam elects Võ Văn Thưởng as the country's new president, replacing Nguyễn Xuân Phúc.

Sports 

3 February – 20 August: 2023 V.League 1
 4 February –  19 August: 2023 V.League 2

Scheduled 

 Miss Grand International 2023 
Miss Earth 2023

References 

 

 
Vietnam
Vietnam
2020s in Vietnam
Years of the 21st century in Vietnam